Federal Way Downtown is a future light rail station at the site of the Federal Way Transit Center, a bus station in Federal Way, Washington. The bus station opened in 2006 and has 1,190 parking spaces available in its parking garage and surface lots. It is served by King County Metro, Pierce Transit and Sound Transit Express buses and is the southern terminus of the RapidRide A Line. The transit center is located adjacent to The Commons at Federal Way shopping mall and Interstate 5, connected via a direct access ramp to its high-occupancy vehicle lanes.

A similar park-and-ride lot, on the south side of South 320th Street and east of the shopping mall, opened on November 5, 1979, using land donated by a local businessman.

As part of the expansion of Link light rail by Sound Transit, the transit center is planned to be the southern terminus of the Federal Way Link Extension, which would extend light rail south from its current terminus at Angle Lake station to Federal Way. A voter-approved plan passed in 2008 proposed funding to design, but not construct, a light rail station and other bus and parking improvements at the transit center. In 2016, the Sound Transit 3 plan approved a 2024 completion date for light rail to Federal Way Transit Center, as well as a light rail extension from Federal Way to Tacoma to be opened by 2030.

The preliminary design for the light rail station consists of an elevated platform along 23rd Avenue South that is located two blocks south of the current transit center. A second garage with 400 parking stalls would be built, along with transit-oriented development on the site of a former shopping center. Demolition of several vacated retail buildings at the site began in April 2020. A series of 35 murals by local artists were installed on the construction site's fences, but were damaged in an act of vandalism in August 2020. Sound Transit officials called the incident racially-motivated, as the murals were primarily celebrating the area's Pacific Islander, Black, and Asian communities.

Light rail service is expected to begin in 2025.

References

External links

Transport infrastructure completed in 2006
2006 establishments in Washington (state)
Federal Way, Washington
Future Link light rail stations
Transportation buildings and structures in King County, Washington
Bus stations in Washington (state)
Sound Transit Express
King County Metro
Link light rail stations in King County, Washington
Railway stations scheduled to open in 2025